University Academy may refer to:

United Kingdom
University Academy Holbeach
University Academy Birkenhead, the former name of Birkenhead Park School
University Academy Kidsgrove, the former name of Kidsgrove Secondary School
University Academy Liverpool, the former name of King's Leadership Academy Liverpool
University Academy Warrington, the former name of Padgate Academy

United States
University Preparatory Academy, California
University Academy, Kansas City
University Academy Charter High School, New Jersey